Penicillium dravuni is a monoverticillate and sclerotium forming species of the genus of Penicillium which was isolated from the alga Dictyosphaeria versluyii in Dravuni on Fiji. Penicillium dravuni produces dictyosphaeric acids A, dictyosphaeric acids B and carviolin.

See also
 List of Penicillium species

Further reading

References 

dravuni
Fungi described in 2005